Xue Jinhua (born 13 May 1965) is a Chinese handball player. She competed in the women's tournament at the 1988 Summer Olympics.

References

1965 births
Living people
Chinese female handball players
Olympic handball players of China
Handball players at the 1988 Summer Olympics
Place of birth missing (living people)
Asian Games medalists in handball
Asian Games silver medalists for China
Medalists at the 1990 Asian Games
Handball players at the 1990 Asian Games
20th-century Chinese women